In the bin covering problem, items of different sizes must be packed into a finite number of bins or containers, each of which must contain at least a certain given total size, in a way that maximizes the number of bins used. 

This problem is a dual of the bin packing problem: in bin covering, the bin sizes are bounded from below and the goal is to maximize their number; in bin packing, the bin sizes are bounded from above and the goal is to minimize their number.

The problem is NP-hard, but there are various efficient approximation algorithms:

 Algorithms covering at least 1/2, 2/3 or 3/4 of the optimum bin count asymptotically, running in time  respectively.
 An asymptotic PTAS, algorithms with bounded worst-case behavior whose expected behavior is asymptotically-optimal for some discrete distributions, and a learning algorithm with asymptotically optimal expected behavior for all discrete distributions.
 An asymptotic FPTAS.

The bidirectional bin-filling algorithm 
Csirik, Frenk, Lebbe and Zhang present the following simple algorithm for 2/3 approximation. Suppose the bin size is 1 and there are n items.

 Order the items from the largest (1) to smallest (n).
 Fill a bin with the largest items: 1, 2, ..., m, where m is the largest integer for which the sum of items 1, ..., m is less than 1.
 Add to this bin the smallest items: n, n-1, ..., until its value raises above 1.

For any instance I,  denote by  the number of bins in the optimal solution, and by  the number of full bins in the bidirectional filling algorithm. Then  , or equivalently,  . 

For the proof, the following terminology is used.

  the number of bins filled by the algorithm.
 the t bins filled by the algorithm.
 Initial items - the t items that are inserted first into each of the t bins.
 Final items - the t items that are inserted last into each of the t bins.
 Middle items - all items that are neither initial nor final.
 := the number of final items that are at most 1/2 (equivalently,  is the number of final items larger than 1/2).
The sum of each bin  is at least 1, but if the final item is removed from it, then the remaining sum is smaller than 1.  Each of the first  bins   contains an initial item, possibly some middle items, and a final item.  Each of the last  bins  contains only an initial item and a final item, since both of them are larger than 1/2 and their sum is already larger than 1.

The proof considers two cases.

Then, the sum of every filled  is at most 3/2, and the sum of remaining items is at most 1, so the sum of all items is at most  . On the other hand, in the optimal solution the sum of every bin is at least 1, so the sum of all items is at least . Therefore,  as required.

 the optimal bins with no initial/final items (only middle items).
  the optimal bins with exactly one initial/final item (and some middle items).
  the optimal bins with two or more initial/final items (and some middle items).

Note that these are the largest initial items. 
Note that these bins contain all the middle items.
 The sum of each bin   without its final item is less than 1. Moreover, the initial item is more than 1/2, so the sum of only the middle items is less than 1/2.
The sum of each optimal bin is at least 1. Hence: , which implies .
Therefore, .
 Summing the latter two inequalities implies that , which implies .

The 2/3 factor is tight for BDF. Consider the following instance (where  is sufficiently small):BDF initializes the first bin with the largest item and fills it with the  smallest items. Then, the remaining  items can cover bins only in triplets, so all in all  bins are filled. But in OPT one can fill  bins, each of which contains two of the middle-sized items and two small items.

Three-classes bin-filling algorithm 
Csirik, Frenk, Lebbe and Zhang present another algorithm that attains a 3/4 approximation. The algorithm orders the items from large to small, and partitions them into three classes:

 X: The items with size at least 1/2;
 Y: The items with size less than 1/2 and at least 1/3;
 Z: The items with size less than 1/3.

The algorithm works in two phases. Phase 1:
 Initialize a new bin with either the largest item in X, or the two largest items in Y, whichever is larger. Note that in both cases, the initial bin sum is less than 1.
Fill the new bin with items from Z in increasing order of value.
Repeat until either X U Y or Z are empty.
Phase 2:

 If X U Y is empty, fill bins with items from Z by the simple next-fit rule.
 If Z is empty, pack the items remaining in X by pairs, and those remaining in Y by triplets.
In the above example, showing the tightness of BDF, the sets are:TCF attains the optimal outcome, since it initializes all  bins with pairs of items from Y, and fills them with pairs of items from Z.

For any instance I,  denote by  the number of bins in the optimal solution, and by  the number of full bins in the three-classes filling algorithm. Then  .

The 3/4 factor is tight for TCF. Consider the following instance (where  is sufficiently small):

TCF initializes the first bin with the largest two items, and fills it with the  smallest items. Then, the remaining  items can cover bins only in groups of four, so all in all  bins are filled. But in OPT one can fill  bins, each of which contains 3 middle-sized items and 3 small items.

Polynomial-time approximation schemes 
Csirik, Johnson and Kenyon present an asymptotic PTAS. It runs in time . The algorithm solves a variant of the configuration linear program, with variables and  constraints.

They also present algorithms for the online version of the problem. In the online setting, it is not possible to get an asymptotic worst-case approximation factor better than 1/2. However, there are algorithms that perform well in the average case.

Jansen and Solis-Oba present an asymptotic FPTAS. It runs in time , where  is the runtime complexity of the best available algorithm for matrix inversion (currently, around ).

Related problems 
In the fair item allocation problem, there are different people each of whom attributes a different value to each item. The goal is to allocate to each person a "bin" full of items, such that the value of each bin is at least a certain constant, and as many people as possible receive a bin. Many techniques from bin covering are used in this problem too.

Implementations 

 Python: The prtpy package contains an implementation of the Csirik-Frenk-Labbe-Zhang algorithms.

References 

Optimization algorithms and methods
Covering problems